Skull and crossbones variations have been used by several military forces. The "Jolly Roger", traditionally used by pirates, has been used by submarines.

Usage

Naval warfare

The Jolly Roger is the name given to any of various flags flown to identify a ship's crew as pirates. Since the decline of piracy, various military units have used the Jolly Roger, usually in skull-and-crossbones design, as a unit identification insignia or a victory flag to ascribe to themselves the proverbial ferocity and toughness of pirates.

Admiral Sir Arthur Wilson VC, the Controller of the Royal Navy, summed up the opinion of the many in the Admiralty at the time when in 1901 he said submarines were "underhand, unfair, and damned un-English. ... treat all submarines as pirates in wartime ... and hang all crews." In response, Lieutenant Commander (later Admiral Sir) Max Horton first flew the Jolly Roger on return to port after sinking the German cruiser  and the destroyer  in 1914 while in command of the E-class submarine .

In World War II it became common practice for the submarines of the Royal Navy to fly the Jolly Roger on completion of a successful combat mission where some action had taken place, but as an indicator of bravado and stealth rather than of lawlessness. The Jolly Roger is now the emblem of the Royal Navy Submarine Service.

Three distinct U.S. Naval Aviation squadrons have used the name and insignia of the Jolly Roger: VF-61 (originally VF-17), VF-84, and VFA-103. While these are distinctly different squadrons that have no lineal linkage, they all share the same "Jolly Roger" name, the skull and crossbones insignia and traditions. The first incarnation of the "Jolly Rogers" was established on 1 January 1943 at NAS Norfolk, as VF-17, flying the F4U Corsair. Inspired by the piratical theme of the aircraft's name, VF-17's commanding officer Tommy Blackburn selected the Jolly Roger as the squadron's insignia. The current squadron to hold the name is the VFA-103, Strike Fighter Squadron 103 (the "Jolly Rogers"), the skull and crossbones on all-black tails makes them easily identifiable.

The United States Marine Corps Reconnaissance Battalions use skull and crossbones on their emblems, and so do several aviation squadrons in the Air Force, Navy and Marine Corps.

Land warfare

Hussars, lancers and dragoons became established types of military units, with their typical uniform patterns (and weapons and tactics) maintained in many armies.
In Chile, during the independence battles, a paramilitary guerrilla group against the royal Spanish army composed mainly by bandits and civilians, called Los húsares de la muerte (The Death Hussars) wore a Skull with two crossed femurs on the neck of their jackets.

In the Estonian War of Independence the skull and crossbones were symbols of Kuperjanov's Partisan Battalion. The badge is still used in the Estonian Army by the Kuperjanov Battalion, for example 2007 in Iraq.

Though not employing a black uniform, the skull and crossbones has been used by a succession of lancer regiments in the British Army. This origin dates back to  the 17th Light Dragoons, a unit raised in 1759 following General Wolfe's death at Quebec, with an emblem of a death's head and the motto 'Or Glory' in commemoration of him. It was later used by the 17th/21st Lancers, the Queen's Royal Lancers, and now the Royal Lancers, who use the skull and crossbones as their Motto. They have also inherited the nickname of the 'Death or Glory Boys'.

In 1792, a regiment of Hussards de la Mort (Death Hussars) was formed during the French Revolution by the French National Assembly and were organized and named by Kellerman. The group of 200 volunteers were from wealthy families and their horses were supplied from the King's Stables. They were formed to defend against various other European states in the wake of the revolution. They participated in the Battle of Valmy and its members also participated in the Battle of Fleurus (1794). They had the following mottos: Vaincre ou mourir, La liberté ou la mort and  Vivre libre ou mourir - Victory or death; Freedom or death; and Live free or die.

The 2nd Lancers Regiment of the Portuguese Army also use the skull and crossbones as symbol and "Death or Glory" as motto, as the regiment was raised by a former colonel of the British 17th Lancers.

During the Russian Civil War, the troops of the White Kornilov Division wore patches emblazoned with a skull and crossbones above a pair of crossed swords.

When Hitler gained power, there were still uniforms that were black and with a rather large (≈10 cm) skull and crossbones on a black cap, but the pattern was adapted for the Nazi SS service, with a "peaked cap" and a tiny skull and crossbones for the cap (≈2.5 cm). And in World War II, Nazi SS troops made use of the "Totenkopf" (German word for "dead man's head") as an insignia for another part of the uniform as well (in particular, the 3rd SS Division, which was a part of the larger Waffen SS), and also by the similarly named World War II-era Luftwaffe's 54th Bomber Wing (Kampfgeschwader 54).

In the former Yugoslavia, and especially Serbia, the skull and crossbones was a prominent symbol used by the Serbian royalist and nationalist paramilitaries known as the Chetniks during the Second World War and the Yugoslav Wars.The Chetnik Detachments of the Yugoslav Army, commonly known as the Chetniks (Serbo-Croatian: Četnici, Четници, pronounced [tʃɛ̂tniːtsi]; Slovene: Četniki), was a World War II movement in Yugoslavia led by Draža Mihailović.

The 3rd Infantry Division of the Republic of Korea Army used skull and crossbones symbol on their division symbol patch.

Aerial warfare

Fighter aircraft of both the Allied Powers and the Central Powers occasionally made use of the a skull and crossbones emblem in World War I, either by itself or as part of a more complex insignia, more often by individual pilots, and in rare instances, by entire aviation units, for example, No 100 Sqn Royal Air Force. The most memorable of these insignia were on the series of French fighter aircraft flown by French 43-victory flying ace Charles Nungesser. All of his aircraft featured his personal "black heart" insignia on the sides of the aircraft's fuselage. The Nungesser insignia centered on a skull and crossbones accompanied by a coffin directly above the skull, and flanked with single candlesticks, all within the black heart-shaped field.

Death symbol bans 
In 2018 the incoming Australian Defence Force chief Lt. Gen. Angus Campbell banned the use of so-called death symbols because they are "at odds with Army's values and the ethical force we seek to build and sustain." The death symbols that were banned in Australia include the skull and crossbones, the comic book characters Phantom and Punisher, as well as the Grim Reaper.

Image gallery

See also

 No. 100 Squadron RAF
 101 Squadron (Israel)
 Danse Macabre
 Totenkopf

References

Military symbols
Heraldic charges